Arthur Pinkerton Crawford (22 September 1923 – 19 June 1995) was a member of the Queensland Legislative Assembly.

Biography
Crawford was born in Caboolture, Queensland, the son of Andrew Pinkerton Crawford and his wife Lilian Mary (née Donnelly). He was educated at Eagle Junction State School before attending the Brisbane Church of England Grammar School. At the age of ten he was confined to bed as a result of polio. He was a Bachelor of Science and Master of Science at the University of Queensland and then was a Post Graduate at the Australian College of Surgeons.
 
On graduation he became a surgical specialist and general practitioner. He was a surgeon to Australian Forces in Vietnam, in 1967-1968 and a lecturer at the Medical School of the University of Queensland. Crawford was also a director of Sanders Chemicals Ltd.

On 6 December 1947, he married Marion Chalk and together had one son and two daughters. Crawford died in June 1995 and was cremated at the Albany Creek Crematorium.

Public life
At the 1969 Queensland state elections, Crawford won the seat of Wavell, and held it until his retirement from politics in 1977.

He was a member of Council of Presbyterian and Methodist Schools Association from 1966 and the Autistic Children's Association from 1970. Crawford was also President of the Right to Life Association (Queensland) from 1971 to 1977 and a councilor for the Family Planning Association.

References

Members of the Queensland Legislative Assembly
Australian surgeons
1923 births
1995 deaths
University of Queensland alumni
Academic staff of the University of Queensland
Liberal Party of Australia members of the Parliament of Queensland
20th-century Australian politicians
20th-century surgeons